Rhagovelia cimarrona is a species of aquatic bug first found in Cimarrones, Chachagüí, Nariño, Colombia.

References

Veliidae
Arthropods of Colombia
Insects described in 2011